Amto (also known as Ki) is an Amto–Musan language spoken in Sandaun Province of Papua New Guinea.

Amto is spoken in Amanab and Rocky Peak Districts, south of the Upper Sepik River, toward the headwaters of the Left May River on the Samaia River. It is spoken in three villages, Amto, Amu, and Habiyon of Green River Rural LLG, Sandaun Province.

References 

Languages of Sandaun Province
Amto–Musan languages